The Cambria Icefield is an icefield in the Boundary Ranges of the Coast Mountains in northwestern British Columbia, Canada, located southeast of Stewart.

Climate

Based on the Köppen climate classification, the Cambria Icefield is located in a subarctic climate zone of western North America. Most weather fronts originate in the Pacific Ocean, and travel east toward the Coast Mountains where they are forced upward by the range (Orographic lift), causing them to drop their moisture in the form of rain or snowfall. As a result, the icefield experiences high precipitation, especially during the winter months in the form of snowfall. Temperatures can drop below −20 °C with wind chill factors below −30 °C.

Gallery

References

Ice fields of British Columbia
Boundary Ranges
Stewart Country